This is a list of Mexican films released in 2011.

References

External links

List of 2011 box office number-one films in Mexico

2011
Films
Mexican